Microsoft codenames are given by Microsoft to products it has in development before these products are given the names by which they appear on store shelves. Many of these products (new versions of Windows in particular) are of major significance to the IT community, and so the terms are often widely used in discussions before the official release. Microsoft usually does not announce a final name until shortly before the product is publicly available. It is not uncommon for Microsoft to reuse codenames a few years after a previous usage has been abandoned.

There has been some suggestion that Microsoft may move towards defining the real name of their upcoming products earlier in the product development lifecycle to avoid needing product codenames.

Operating systems

Windows 3.x and 9x

Windows NT family

Windows as a Service engineering milestones
The following are code names used for internal development cycle iterations of the Windows core, although they are not necessarily the code names of any of the resulting releases. The semester designations are also formally independent of the version numbers used by the releases themselves, although with some exceptions they usually match.

Windows CE family

Windows Mobile

Windows Phone

Others

OS components

Microsoft Servers

SQL Server family

Others

Developers tools

Visual Studio family

.NET Framework family

Languages

Others

Gaming hardware

Office software

Other codenames

References

External links
 Microsoft Codenames List

Codenames
Code names
Computing terminology